α-Acetyldigoxin is a cardiac glycoside. It is an acetyl derivative of digoxin and an isomer of β-acetyldigoxin. It increases the contractility of the heart by its positive inotropic effect on cardiac muscle. The effects of α-acetyldigoxin begin 3–4 hours after administration, and maximize after 6–8 hours. It is prescribed for congestive chronic cardiac failure class II, III and IV.

External links 
 

Cardenolides
Acetate esters